The Collected Stories of Jean Stafford is a short story collection by Jean Stafford. It won the Pulitzer Prize for Fiction in 1970.

Contents

The Innocents Abroad
"Maggie Meriwether's Rich Experience"
"The Children's Game"
"The Echo and the Nemesis"
"The Maiden"
"A Modest Proposal"
"Caveat Emptor"

The Bostonians, and Other Manifestations of the American Scene
"Life is No Abyss"
"The Hope Chest"
"Polite Conversation"
"A Country Love Story"
"The Bleeding Heart"
"The Lippia Lawn"
"The Interior Castle"

Cowboys and Indians, and Magic Mountains
"The Healthiest Girl in Town"
"The Tea Time of the Stouthearted Ladies"
"The Mountain Day"
"The Darkening Moon"
"Bad Characters"
"In the Zoo"
"The Liberation"
"A Reading Problem"
"A Summer Day"
"The Philosophy Lesson"

Manhattan Island
"Children Are Bored on Sunday"
"Beatrice Trueblood's Story"
"Between the Porch and the Altar"
"I Love Someone"
"Cops and Robbers"
"The Captain's Gift"
"The End of a Career"

References

External links
 Photos of the first edition of The Collected Stories of Jean Stafford

1969 short story collections
Pulitzer Prize for Fiction-winning works
American short story collections
Farrar, Straus and Giroux books